The AVIC Dark Sword is a stealthy supersonic unmanned combat aerial vehicle from the People's Republic of China. It is being developed by the Aviation Industry Corporation of China's Shenyang Aircraft Design Institute for the air superiority or deep strike roles. Use as an autonomous wingman for manned aircraft may also be a goal.

Development
A conceptual model appeared at the 2006 China International Aviation & Aerospace Exhibition Early concepts featured a conical planform, static foreplane canards, a wide tail section with canted vertical stabilizers, swept wings, and a single-engine with forward-swept chin-mounted intake. A sub-scale demonstrator may have flown by mid-2018.

An image of a full-scale mock-up or demonstrator emerged in mid-2018. It was at least 12 meters long and shared low-observability features with contemporary Chinese aircraft including a diverterless supersonic inlet.

The drone could potentially be paired with Chengdu J-20 stealth fighter, specifically the twin-seat J-20S for aircraft teaming. Various "loyal wingman" prototypes, including the Dark Sword, were developed in China.

See also

References

Stealth aircraft
Unmanned military aircraft of China
Dark Sword
Unmanned stealth aircraft
Flying wings